Florian Mohr (born 25 August 1984) is a German former professional footballer who played as a defender.

Career
After his contract with FC St. Pauli expired in summer 2014, he signed for fellow 2. Bundesliga club Greuther Fürth on a two-year deal.

References

External links
 
 

1984 births
Living people
Footballers from Hamburg
German footballers
Association football defenders
2. Bundesliga players
3. Liga players
SC Concordia von 1907 players
SV Werder Bremen players
SV Werder Bremen II players
SC Paderborn 07 players
FC St. Pauli players
SpVgg Greuther Fürth players